This is a list of orchidologists, botanists specializing in the study of orchids. The list is sorted in the surname alphabetical order.

A 
 Oakes Ames (botanist) (1874–1950), an American biologist specializing in orchids
Joseph Arditti (1932-), an American plant physiologist specializing in orchids

B 
 Ray Barkalow (born 1952), a US scientist and engineer, known for using science to explain or dispel orchid-growing myths.
 James Bateman (1811–1897), a British landowner and accomplished horticulturist
 Carl Ludwig Blume (1796–1862), a German-Dutch botanist
 Diego Bogarín (born 1982), a Costa Rican biologist specialised in orchid phylogenetics, systematics and taxonomy of Neotropical Orchidaceae

C 

 Cedric Errol Carr (1892–1936), a New Zealand botanist, specialising in orchids
 Arthur Chadwick (born 1962), an american orchid grower
 James Boughtwood Comber (1929-2005), a British botanist
 Eugène Jacob de Cordemoy (1835-1911), a French physician and botanist

D 
 Walter Davis (botanist)
 John Day (botanist) (1824–1888), an English orchid-grower and collector, and is noted for producing some 4000 illustrations of orchid species
 Helga Dietrich (1940–2018), a German botanist and orchidologist
 Margaret A. Dix (born 1939), English-born Guatemalan biologist, taxonomist
 Donald Dungan Dod (1912–2008), an American missionary and orchidologist
 Calaway H. Dodson (born 1928), an American botanist, orchidologist, and taxonomist
 Robert Louis Dressler, (born 1927) is an American botanist specialist of the taxonomy of the Orchidaceae.

E 
 Rica Erickson (1908–2009), an Australian naturalist, botanical artist, historian, author and teacher
 Ekrem Sezik a Turkish academician, pharmacist and author.
Choy sin Hew, a Singapore plant physiologist specializing in orchids

F 
 Achille Eugène Finet (1863–1913), a French botanist best known for his study of orchids native to Japan and China
 Ernesto Foldats (1925 – 2003), a Latvian-Venezuelan botanist and orchidologist
 Noriaki Fukuyama (1912–1946), a Japanese botanist and orchidologist

G 
 Leslie Andrew Garay (born 1924), an American botanist
 Samuel Goodenough (1743–1827), an amateur botanist and collector
 Barbara Gravendeel (born 1968), a Dutch evolutionary biologist, specialised in orchid phylogenetics, systematics and developmental studies

H 
 Karl Theodor Hartweg (1812-1871), a German botanist
 Alex Drum Hawkes (1927-1977), an American botanist and cookbook author from Coconut Grove, Florida & Kingston, Jamaica. Specialized in orchids, bromeliads, palm trees, ferns, vegetables & fruits.
 Abel Aken Hunter (1877-1936), an American botanist in Panama

K 
 Adam P. Karremans (born 1986), Dutch-Costa Rican botanist specialised in phylogenetics and systematics of Neotropical Orchidaceae
 Carolus Adrianus Johannes Kreutz (born 1954), Dutch botanist and taxonomist, specialising in European orchids

L 
  (1879-1969), British born, known for his orchid work in Costa Rica
 Carlos Adolfo Lehnebach (1974- ), Chilean born botanist. Moved to New Zealand in 2000. Research interests are pollination, taxonomy and conservation of New Zealand orchids. His collections are stored at the WELT herbarium (Museum of New Zealand Te Papa Tongarewa)
 Jean Jules Linden (1817-1898), a Belgian botanist and explorer, horticulturist and businessman, specialising in orchids
 John Lindley
 Hugh Low

M 
 Hanna Margońska (born 1968), a Polish botanist
 Theodore Luqueer Mead (1852-1936), an American naturalist, entomologist and horticulturist known for his pioneering work on the growing and cross-breeding of orchids
 Brian John Peter Molloy (born 1930), New Zealand botanist
 Henry Moon (1857-1905), an English landscape and botanical painter, noted for his orchid paintings

P 
 Ernst Hugo Heinrich Pfitzer (1846-1906), a German botanist specialist of the taxonomy of the Orchidaceae
 Charles Wesley Powell (1854-1927), an American hobbyist and self-taught horticulturist specializing in the orchids of Panama
 George Harry Pring a British born orchid and water lily specialist known for his work at the Missouri Botanical Garden
 Franco Pupulin (born 1960), an Italian botanist specialised in orchid taxonomy and systematics

Q 
 Eduardo Quisumbíng (1895–1986), a Filipino plant biologist

R 
 Heinrich Gustav Reichenbach (1823–1889), a botanist and the foremost German orchidologist of the 19th century
 Benedikt Roezl (1823-1885), a Czech botanist, gardener, and explorer, among the most famous orchid collectors of his time
 Robert Allen Rolfe (1855–1921), a British botanist and the first curator of the orchid herbarium at the Royal Botanic Gardens, Kew, England
 Santosh Kumar Reddy (1984-present), an Indian Forest Service officer, is among the most famous orchidologists in Arunachal Pradesh, India

S 
 Henry Frederick Conrad Sander
 Rudolf Schlechter (1872-1925), a German taxonomist, botanist and author of several works on orchids
 Alexander Skutch
 Paul Carpenter Standley an American botanist, specializing in the flora of Central America, including orchids
 Olof Swartz (1760–1818), a Swedish botanist and taxonomist, and the first specialist of orchid taxonomy
 Dariusz Szlachetko (born 1961), a Polish botanist

T 
 Louis-Marie Aubert du Petit-Thouars (1758–1831), a French botanist known for his work collecting and describing orchids from the three islands of Madagascar, Mauritius and Réunion

V 
 Louis van Houtte (1810-1876), a Belgian horticulturist
 Ed de Vogel (born 1942), a Dutch orchidologist specialist of the orchid flora of Southeast Asia

W 
 Józef Warszewicz (1812-1866), a Polish botanist, plant and animal collector and biologist
 Benjamin Samuel Williams (1822–1890), an English orchidologist and nurseryman in London

References 

 
Orchidologists